Porter Lyons is a jewelry and lifestyle brand created by Ashley Porter. The line debuted in November 2012 in New Orleans, Louisiana. The line has been worn by many celebrities, such as Taylor Swift, Jessica Alba, Jennifer Lawrence and Cameron Diaz and has been featured in Elle and W Magazine.

Background 
Porter Lyons was created by Ashley Ann Lyons Porter in 2012. The namesake brand and its New Orleans headquarters is inspired by her family's origins in New Orleans, dating back to 1860 where they had a pharmacy, IL Lyons. 

Initially, Lyons was inspired by the Native American belief to use every part of an animal, and began experimenting with casting alligator teeth and bones in brass. This led to her first jewelry collection, Backbone, and in 2016 expanded Porter Lyons into a global fine jewelry and lifestyle brand.

In 2022 Porter Lyons' design house and Flagship store relocated to Royal Street, New Orleans.

Work

Collections

2012 – Backbone Collection 
Upon designing leather belts with alligator hide. This collection explores the alligator using bones as material source.

2012 – Hatch Collection 
Inspired by interchangeable travel jewelry in conjunction with an Imperial Fabergé egg that resides in New Orleans, this collection includes magnetic egg closures.

2013 – Agate Collection 

Highlighting Louisiana's state mineral, agate, this collection incorporates Louisiana's natural resources for material sources.

2013–2015 – Rebuild and Category X Collection 
The rebuild collection debuted in 2013 with one of the lines signature pieces, the coordinate ID bracelet, and has since been seen on Lauren Conrad, Shaun White, and Kelly Osbourne. The collection continues to grow and merged with the 2015 debut of Category X which commemorates the 10-year anniversary of Hurricane Katrina.

2014 Voodoo Collection 
Inspired by the voodoo religion in New Orleans, this collection was inspired the metaphysical crystal properties of stones.

2015 Deco Bohemia 
This collection, launched October 24, 2015, focuses on the art and Bohemian culture in the 1920s French Quarter.

2016 Creole Wild West 
Inspired by the culture of the Mardi Gras Indians, the collection that launched in August 2016 incorporates intricate bead work, tribal symbols and materials native to Louisiana. The collection also includes hand made dreamcatchers that utilize beading techniques taught to the designer by Big Chief Harold Miller of the Creole Wild West tribe.

2016 Crescent City Collection 
Porter debuted her first fine jewelry collection October 2016. Referencing the astrological placement of New Orleans, each piece has hidden longitude and latitude of the city hidden within the design. The collection predominately uses blue diamonds as a statement feature in each piece.

2017 Veve Collection 
The second fine jewelry collection debuted in October 2017. The collection's fine jewelry is inspired by the symbols & history of Voudou in New Orleans. Asymmetrical precious stones, serpents and evil eyes are but a few of the symbols featured.

2018 Love Collection 

A collection for lovers. This collection featured the Bee Mine earrings and necklace and launched just before Valentine’s Day.

2018 Pharmacy Collection 

Inspired by Ashley’s New Orleans heritage. The Lyons lineage dates to 1866 where they started I.L. Lyons Pharmacy, one of the largest pharmacies in the south. This collection focuses on the mysticism of ancient healers and begins at the basic bore of who we are – our molecular DNA blueprints.
 
2019 Relics Collection

Beautiful organic artifacts, surviving from an earlier time, Relics featured pieces made from dinosaur bones, rare gaspeite, pyritized ammonite, red fire quartz and more.

2020 Naked Collection

Jewels that never comes off, even when everything else does. Classic pieces designed with a bit of edge. Simple but striking fine jewelry for the ultra-sophisticated. This collection features jewelry that can be worn with anything and is meant to compliment every wearer.

2020 Música Universalis Collection

Inspired by the ancient philosophical concept of universal music; perfect proportions in the movement of celestial bodies. To Porter Lyons, music is just that, an Earthly rhythm that exists in us all.

2021 Alligatorea Collection

A reflection on where Porter Lyons began, by studying alligators down to their bones. In this collection Ashley revisits this prehistoric creature and pays homage to the brands heritage.           

2022 IMBIBE Collection

This collection was designed to invite the wearer to explore what you IMBIBE and ingest into your mind and body on a physical and emotional level. Absorb the vibes.

Brick and mortar 
Porter Lyons opened their flagship store in New Orleans' French Quarter October 22, 2016, located at 631 Toulouse Street. 

The concept store features a gallery space, juice bar, sage bar, and jewelry retail.

Luxury Piercings 
In 2020 Porter Lyons began hosting Piercing Parties using all 14K Gold earrings designed by Ashley Porter. 

In 2022 Porter Lyons opened their piercing studio at the Flagship location in New Orleans, mainly focusing on ear piercing but expanding into nose and lip piercings that Fall.

About the designer 
Ashley Porter grew up in Northern California and is based in New Orleans where her family heritage dates back to the early 1860s. She holds a Bachelor of Science in Marketing and a Master of Finance from Tulane University, and also has a graduate degree from the Fashion Institute of Design and Merchandising in Los Angeles. Prior to launching Porter Lyons she worked for Balenciaga and Ralph Lauren in New York.

Inspiration 
Porter Lyons draws inspiration from the founder's family history, as well as New Orleans culture and traditions. Each collection focuses on a subculture and uses materials that reference the concept through locally sourced materials. Porter has said that her mission is to "preserve culture through design."

Philanthropy 
In the Backbone collection, Porter Lyons focused its efforts on Louisiana by donating 5% of all profits to the Coalition to Restore Coastal Louisiana.

Porter Lyons' campaign, "Light Up for Literacy", donates 50% of custom earring sales to Louisiana Endowment for Humanities. The campaign launched in September 2014.

With the launch of "Deco Bohemia" in October 2015, Porter Lyons partnered with the George Rodrigue Foundation of the Arts to support children's art programs around Louisiana.

"I plan to turn Porter Lyons into a lifestyle brand", said Porter on MarthaStewart.com, "staying true to my mission of aiding different relief efforts based on which culture the item is inspired by."

References

External links 
 Official Site 
 Live Fast Magazine Studio Visit

Jewelry companies of the United States
Manufacturing companies based in New Orleans